Class 20 was a class of steam locomotives for Yugoslav Railways and other railways built by Hanomag, Borsig and AEG. Krauss and Rheinmetall between 1912 and 1922.

Albania
In 1946, 2 of them came to Albania, 20-132 and 20-136. Around 1960 these two locomotives were taken out of service.

Preserved
 20-100 (ex SHS 6100) is preserved in Niš, Serbia
 20-149 (ex SHS 6149) is preserved in Zrenjanin, Serbia
 20-196 (ex SHS 6196) is preserved in Sombor, Serbia
 20-184 (ex SHS 6184) is preserved in Jasenovac, Croatia
 20-183 (ex SHS 6183) is preserved in Trebnje, Slovenia

References

External links 

Steam locomotives of Yugoslavia
Standard gauge locomotives of Yugoslavia
Steam locomotives of Albania
Standard gauge locomotives of Albania